The Type C6 ship is a United States Maritime Administration (MARAD) designation for a container ship developed during the transition years from moving goods by breakbulk cargo to containerization. The Type C4 ships Mariner class, arranged with its house/engine-room in the center of the vessel with cargo hatches at 4 forward and 2 aft, was very successful.  Eleven of these Mariner ships were converted into Type C6 container ships, and eight vessels were new built. As of November 2020 only three C6 ships, the converted C4s, are extant.  All three are crane ships in the National Defense Reserve Fleet.

American President Lines
Three vessels of the American President Lines had been built in 1966 as Type C4-S-1qa ships by National Steel and Shipbuilding, San Diego, California.  Between 1972 and 1973 these breakbulk cargo vessels were converted into partial containerships.  The conversion work was done at Todd Pacific Shipyards, Seattle, Washington. Overall length was extended by 105 ft. Bow thrusters were also fitted into the ships for improved maneuverability along with an improved stabilization system. Between 1984-1986 all three vessels were acquired by the U.S.Navy and re-fitted as Auxiliary Crane Ships for use by the Military Sealift Command (C6-S-MA1qd).  As of April 2020 all three of these converted vessels were listed in the Ready Reserve Force, National Defense Reserve Fleet.

The American President lines also took delivery on four new built ships, designated Type C6-S-85b, the Pacesetters, from Ingalls Shipbuilding in Pascagoula, Mississippi. Three were delivered in 1973 and the fourth in 1974. Between 1979 and 1982 the vessels were traded in to MARAD as partial down payment for new ships. They were first laid up at the Suisun Bay Reserve Fleet but were eventually scrapped.

United States Lines
The United States Lines choose all 8 of their C4-S-1a cargo vessels for conversion to C6-S-1w container ships. The conversion work was divided among five shipyards, and the vessels re-entered service between late 1970 and early 1971. The vessel overall length was increased by approximately 100 ft. The vessels remained in service until 1983 when they were laid-up at New York City but by 1987 all eight vessels were scrapped.

Farrell Lines
The Farrell Lines commissioned naval architect George G. Sharp to develop a design for their rapidly growing services. The four new-built vessels were designated as Type C6-S-85a by the Maritime Commission. The vessels were built at the Ingalls Shibuilding(West Yard) with delivery starting in December 1970. The ships operated between U.S. Atlantic and Gulf of Mexico ports and to Australia and New Zealand. All four vessels were eventually acquired by Horizon Lines and remained in service until 2014. Ex-Astral Endurance was scrapped in 2014 after Horizon reduced the frequency of service between Puerto Rico and the US. In December 2014 Horizon ended all service to Puerto Rico and sold the former Austral Entente to All Star Metals LLC, Brownsville, Texas, for demolition in the US, though the vessel was subsequently towed to India. Ex-Austral Ensign, after having been laid up Bellingham, WA since 2007, was sold for scrap in April 2016. The remaining Farrell Lines ship, ex-Austral Envoy, was last named Matson Navigator and sold for scrap in 2018.

References

Container ships
Ship types
Container ship classes
Ship classes